Road Movies is the third and final album by the American group Land.  Road Movies was recorded between June, 1998 & February, 1999 at Jack Straw Productions in Seattle and was released on February 13, 2001 on the First World Music label. It was named one of the Top Ten releases of 2001 by Pulse! (Instrumental/Ambient) and the Seattle Weekly (Jazz).

By the time the recording of Road Movies began in 1998, Land had gone through a number of personnel changes and had developed a much harder edged sound.  Guitarist Dennis Rea, interviewed at the time, is quoted: "The current lineup is more of a 'rock' band than earlier editions, and is much more explosive and in-your-face.  Our connection with ambient music is pretty tenuous at this point."  Amazon.com's editorial review describes the album: "Road Movies is a collection of nine compositions primarily recorded live in the studio. It is the first release featuring the powerful rhythm section of Bill Rieflin and Fred Chalenor who lend a more propulsive, focused, and dynamic element to the group. Hence, Road Movies is sometimes intense, other times playful, often beautiful, and always a fascinating listening experience."

Track listing
Tyrone - 5:21
Magnesium - 4:22
Rink - 4:54
Frolic - 6:08
Winnebago Weekend - 7:07
Vespa - 3:50
Strife - 5:35
Flagpole - 4:33
Sauce - 6:14

Personnel
Fred Chalenor - Bass
Lesli Dalaba - Trumpet
Jeff Greinke -  Sounds & rhythm
Dennis Rea - Guitar
Bill Rieflin - Drums
Doug Haire - Engineer

Notes

References
CD Liner notes
Allmusic [ Road Movies]  Retrieved November 29, 2007.
Discogs Road Movies  Retrieved November 29, 2007.

2001 albums
Land (band) albums